Hydrobiology is the science of life and life processes in water. Much of modern hydrobiology can be viewed as a sub-discipline of ecology but the sphere of hydrobiology includes taxonomy, economic and industrial biology, morphology, and physiology. The one distinguishing aspect is that all fields relate to aquatic organisms. Most work is related to limnology and can be divided into lotic system ecology (flowing waters) and lentic system ecology (still waters).

One of the significant areas of current research is eutrophication. Special attention is paid to biotic interactions in plankton assemblage including the microbial loop, the mechanism of influencing algal blooms, phosphorus load, and lake turnover. Another subject of research is the acidification of mountain lakes. Long-term studies are carried out on changes in the ionic composition of the water of rivers, lakes and reservoirs in connection with acid rain and fertilization. One goal of current research is elucidation of the basic environmental functions of the ecosystem in reservoirs, which are important for water quality management and water supply.

Much of the early work of hydrobiologists concentrated on the biological processes utilized in sewage treatment and water purification especially slow sand filters. Other historically important work sought to provide biotic indices for classifying waters according to the biotic communities that they supported. This work continues to this day in Europe in the development of classification tools for assessing water bodies for the EU water framework directive.

A hydrobiologist technician conducts field analysis for hydrobiology. They identify plants and living species, locate their habitat, and count them. They also identify pollutants and nuisances that can affect the aquatic fauna and flora. They take the samples and write reports of their observations for publications.

A hydrobiologist engineer intervenes more in the process of the study. They define the intervention protocols and what samples should be taken. They plan and program the study campaigns, and then summarize their results. In the event of pollution, they propose solutions to improve the biological quality of water within the framework of the regulations in force. In the case of complex programs, hydrobiologists can work in a multidisciplinary team with botanists and zoologists.

The hydrobiologist works on behalf of large public institutions of a scientific and technological nature (CNRS, INRA, IRD, CIRAD, IRSTEA ...), public institutions (Water Agencies, Regional Directorates environment, Higher Council of Fisheries, CEMAGREF ...), companies (EDF, Veolia environment, Suez environment, Saur, ...), local authorities, research departments, and associations (Federations of fishing, Permanent Centers for Environmental Initiatives ...).

Training and studies 
The biologist technician usually has a training level bac +2 or bac +3:

- DUT biological engineering options biological and biochemical analyzes (ABB), environmental engineering,

- BTSA water professions

- BTS GEMEAU - water management and control

- BTS and regional controls

- BTSA Agricultural, Biological and Biotechnological Analyzes (ANABIOTEC)

- DEUST analysis of biological media

- Bachelor's degree in biology

The engineer in hydrobiology has a training level bac +5:

- engineering school diploma: INA, ENSA, Polytech Montpellier sciences and water technologies

- master's degree in environmental sciences or biology (training examples)

environmental management and coastal ecology (University of La Rochelle)

biology of organisms and populations (University of Burgundy)

continental and coastal environments sciences Environment, Soils, Waters and Biodiversity (University of Rouen)

operation and restoration of continental aquatic environments (University of Clermont Ferrand), etc.

Field of research interests 
The following are the research interests of Hydrobiologists:

 Acidification impact on lake and reservoir ecosystems
 Ocean acidification
 Paleolimnology of remote mountain lakes
 Molecular ecology, phylogeography and taxonomy of Cladocera
 Chemical communication in plankton (prey-predator interaction)
 Biomanipulation of water reservoirs
 Phosphorus and nitrogen nutrient cycles

Organizations 

American Society of Limnology and Oceanography (ASLO)
International Association of Theoretical and Applied Limnology (SIL)
American Fisheries Society
Freshwater Biological Association, England
Marine Biological Laboratory (USA)
Australian Society for Fish Biology
Fisheries and Marine Institute of Memorial University of Newfoundland
Department of Hydrobiology (Charles University, Prague)
Dresden University of Technology Institute of Hydrobiology
Institute of Hydrobiology and Fishery Science
Water Research Institute T.G.M.
Hydrobiological Institute, Academy of Science of Czech Republic
Research Institute of Fish Culture and Hydrobiology
Department of Hydrobiology, Slovak Academy of Science, Bratislava, Slovakia
Max-Planck-Institut fur Limnologie in Ploen, Germany 
CNR-Istituto Italiano di Idrobiologia
Institute of Hydrobiology, Chinese Academy of Sciences
Hydrobiology Pty Ltd Brisbane, Australia based private consulting company
Institute of Zoology and Hydrobiology University of Tartu, Estonia
Department of Hydrobiology Bulgarian Academy of Sciences
Department of General and Applied Hydrobiology Faculty of Biology, Sofia University "Sveti Kliment Ohridski", Bulgaria

Journals 

Fundamental and Applied Limnology
International Review of Hydrobiology
Indian Hydrobiology
Hydrobiologia
The African Journal of Tropical Hydrobiology and Fisheries 
Review of Hydrobiology 
The Biological Bulletin

Notable researchers
Jacques Cousteau
Jane Lubchenco

See also 

 Aquatic ecosystem
 Aquatic toxicology
 Freshwater biology
 Marine biology 
 Marine life

References 

E.P.H. Best (Editor), Jan P. Bakker (Editor) Netherlands-Wetlands (Developments in Hydrobiology series) (Kluwer Academic Publishers, Dordrecht, 1993, 328 pp) 
R.I. Jones (Editor), V. Ilmavirta (Editor) Flagellates in Freshwater Ecosystems (Developments in Hydrobiology series)  (Kluwer Academic Publishers, Dordrecht, 1992, 498pp.) 
Jürgen Schwoerbel Methods of hydrobiology (freshwater biology) (Pergamon Press; [1st English ed.] edition, 1970, 200pp.) 
Hydrobiologist by Josée Lesparre © CIDJ - 09/2019

Citations 

 Kopáček, Jiří; Kaňa, Jiří; Bičárová, Svetlana; Brahney, Janice; Navrátil, Tomáš; Norton, Stephen A.; Porcal, Petr; Stuchlík, Evžen (2019-09-06). "Climate change accelerates recovery of the Tatra Mountain lakes from acidification and increases their nutrient and chlorophyll a concentrations". Aquatic Sciences.
  Beamish, Richard J.; Harvey, Harold H. (2011-04-13). "Acidification of the La Cloche Mountain Lakes, Ontario, and Resulting Fish Mortalities". Journal of the Fisheries Board of Canada. 
  Qu, Bin; Zhang, Yulan; Kang, Shichang; Sillanpää, Mika (2019-02-01). "Water quality in the Tibetan Plateau: Major ions and trace elements in rivers of the "Water Tower of Asia"". Science of the Total Environment.
  Galizia Tundisi, José (2018-08-01). "Reservoirs: New challenges for ecosystem studies and environmental management". Water Security. 
 "Introduction to the EU Water Framework Directive  - Environment - European Commission". ec.europa.eu. Retrieved 2022-03-01
  Doney, Scott C.; Busch, D. Shallin; Cooley, Sarah R.; Kroeker, Kristy J. (2020-10-17). "The Impacts of Ocean Acidification on Marine Ecosystems and Reliant Human Communities". Annual Review of Environment and Resources.
  Moser, Katrina A.; Hundey, Elizabeth J.; Sia, Maria E.; Doyle, Rebecca M.; Dunne, Holly; Longstaffe, Fred J. (2020-05-01). "Factors Leading to Increased Algal Production in Mountain Lakes: A Paleolimnological Perspective from the Uinta Mountains, Utah, USA": 
  Bekker, Eugeniya I.; Karabanov, Dmitry P.; Galimov, Yan R.; Haag, Christoph R.; Neretina, Tatiana V.; Kotov, Alexey A. (2018-03-15). "Phylogeography of Daphnia magna Straus (Crustacea: Cladocera) in Northern Eurasia: Evidence for a deep longitudinal split between mitochondrial lineages".
  Shemi, Adva; Alcolombri, Uria; Schatz, Daniella; Farstey, Viviana; Vincent, Flora; Rotkopf, Ron; Ben-Dor, Shifra; Frada, Miguel J.; Tawfik, Dan S.; Vardi, Assaf (2021-11). "Dimethyl sulfide mediates microbial predator–prey interactions between zooplankton and algae in the ocean". Nature Microbiology
  Jůza, Tomáš; Duras, Jindřich; Blabolil, Petr; Sajdlová, Zuzana; Hess, Josef; Chocholoušková, Zdeňka; Kubečka, Jan (2019-10-01). "Recovery of the Velky Bolevecky pond (Plzen, Czech Republic) via biomanipulation – Key study for management". Ecological Engineering
  Hecky, R. E.; Bootsma, H. A.; Mugidde, R. M.; Bugenyi, F. W. B. (1996), "Phosphorus Pumps, Nitrogen Sinks, and Silicon Drains: Plumbing Nutrients in the African Great Lakes", The Limnology, Climatology and Paleoclimatology of the East African Lakes, Routledge

External links 
Hydrobiology website Website for Hydrobiology, Aquacultures, Ichthyology, Water purification and Biological Oceanology - Bulgaria.
The International Congress on the Biology of Fish
Annual Larval Fish Conference
Annual Northeast Fish and Wildlife Conference
The Waterrose Aquatic Ecology Page 
Developments in Hydrobiology-Springer Book Series Prints proceedings for international conferences on Hydrobiology

Aquatic biomes
Aquatic ecology
Branches of biology